Black Monday is an American historical  dark comedy television series created by Jordan Cahan and David Caspe that premiered on January 20, 2019, on Showtime. The series stars Don Cheadle, Andrew Rannells, Regina Hall, Casey Wilson, and Paul Scheer, and follows the employees of second-tier Wall Street trading firm the Jammer Group during the year leading up to "Black Monday", the day when international stock markets crashed in 1987. In April 2019, the series was renewed for a second season that premiered on March 15, 2020. In October 2020, the series was renewed for a third season, which premiered on May 23, 2021. In January 2022, the series was cancelled after three seasons.

Premise
Black Monday is described as taking the audience "back to October 19, 1987—aka Black Monday, the worst stock market crash in Wall Street history. To this day, no one knows who caused it—until now. It's the story of how a group of outsiders took on the blue-blood, old-boys club of Wall Street and ended up crashing the world's largest financial system, a Lamborghini limousine, Don Henley's birthday party and the glass ceiling."

Plot
The first season follows Blair Pfaff, an aspiring white stockbroker on Wall Street. Through a series of farcical events, he ends up working for Maurice Monroe, a veteran stockbroker. Blair endures workplace hazing and fights to prove he's tough enough for the high-stakes environment. Simultaneously, he tries to preserve his strained engagement to spoiled heiress, Tiffany Georgina. Monroe plans to use Blair to execute an underhanded business deal that involves buying out Tiffany's family company, Georgina Jeans.

Dawn Darcy, the only woman among her coworkers, is running out of patience when it comes to Monroe's unwillingness to recognize her value in the workplace. Her husband wants to have children, leading to a crossroads in their marriage. Keith, an employee who takes interest in bullying Blair, is a closeted homosexual who carries on an affair with a Broadway performer. Monroe, meanwhile, struggles with the internal turmoil of reaching the high standards he sets for himself, as well as living under a false identity.

The resulting backdoor deals, personal conflicts, and the journey of a particular pin create an increasingly convoluted mess as Black Monday approaches.

Cast and characters

Main
Don Cheadle as Maurice Monroe
Andrew Rannells as Blair Pfaff
Regina Hall as Dawn Darcy
Paul Scheer as Keith Shankar
Casey Wilson as Tiffany Georgina (recurring in seasons 1–2; main cast, season 3)

Recurring
Yassir Lester as Yassir X
Ken Marino as Larry and Lenny Lehman
Horatio Sanz as Wayne (seasons 1–3)
Kadeem Hardison as Spencer (season 1)
Eugene Cordero as Ronnie (season 1)
Jason Michael Snow as Mike (season 1)
Julie Hagerty as Mrs. Georgina (seasons 1–2)
Phil Reeves Mr. Georgina (seasons 1–2)
Dannah Feinglass as Agent Mills (season 1)
Danielle Schneider as Agent Fox (season 1)
Bruce Dern as Rod "The Jammer" Jaminski (season 1)
Kurt Braunohler as Ty Daverman (season 1)
Melissa Rauch as Shira (season 1)
Dulé Hill as  Marcus Duane Wainwright III (season 2)
Tuc Watkins as Congressman Roger Harris (season 2)
June Diane Raphael as Corky Harris (seasons 2–3)
Michael Hitchcock as Pastor Newell (seasons 2–3)
Patrick Fabian as Governor Putnam (season 2)
Xosha Roquemore as Connie (seasons 1–2)
Sam Asghari as Giancarlo (season 3)
Thomas Barbusca as Werner (season 3)

Guest
Michael James Scott as Chad ("365")
Hugh Dane as Calvin ("365")
Paul Rust as Brandt ("364")
Teresa Ganzel as Trisha ("364")
Vanessa Bell Calloway as Ruth ("339", "Arthur Ponzarelli")
Tim Russ as Walter Darcy ("339")
Tim Heidecker as Not Milken #1 ("243")
Fred Melamed as Not Milken #2 ("243")

Episodes

Season 1 (2019)

Season 2 (2020)

Season 3 (2021)

Production

Development
In 2013, Showtime began to develop the production, then titled Ball Street, but the series never ended up moving beyond the developmental stage. In the fourth quarter of 2016, following the purchase of a pilot by David Caspe and Jordan Cahan, the project was put back into development with Caspe and Cahan in charge.

On September 7, 2017, it was announced that Showtime had given the production a pilot order. The pilot script was written by Caspe and Cahan, both of whom were also expected to act as showrunners. The pilot was set to be directed by Canadian comedians Seth Rogen and Evan Goldberg, who were also to serve as executive producers along with Caspe and Cahan. Production companies involved with the pilot included Sony Pictures Television.

On June 14, 2018, it was announced that Showtime had given the production, now titled Black Monday, a series order for a first season consisting of ten episodes. On October 19, 2018, it was reported that the series would premiere on January 20, 2019.

On April 29, 2019, Showtime renewed the series for a second season, which premiered on March 15, 2020. On October 15, 2020, Showtime renewed the series for a third season, which premiered on May 23, 2021. On January 20, 2022, Paul Scheer revealed on his Twitch stream, FriendZone with his co-host, Rob Huebel that the series was not renewed.

Casting
Alongside the pilot order announcement, it was confirmed that Don Cheadle and Andrew Rannells had been cast in the series' lead roles. On February 12, 2018, it was announced that Regina Hall, Paul Scheer, Kurt Braunohler, and Eugene Cordero had joined the pilot's cast. Additionally, it was reported that Casey Wilson would guest star in the pilot with the potential to become a recurring cast member if the pilot was picked up to series.

Alongside the series order announcement, it was confirmed that Yassir Lester and Michael James Scott had joined the cast and that Ken Marino would make a guest appearance. On September 20, 2018, it was announced that Kadeem Hardison had been cast in a recurring role. On October 16, 2018, it was reported that Bruce Dern, Melissa Rauch, Horatio Sanz, Julie Hagerty, Vanessa Bell Calloway, Tim Russ and Jason Michael Snow would appear in guest starring roles.

Filming
Principal photography for the pilot was expected to begin in mid-February 2018 in Los Angeles, California. Filming for the rest of season one began on September 28, 2018, at the Millennium Biltmore Hotel in Downtown Los Angeles.

Release

Marketing
In September 2018, the first teaser trailer for the series was released, followed in October by the official trailer. In December 2018, a second teaser trailer was released. On December 28, 2018, the first episode of the series was released early through Facebook, YouTube, and Showtime's streaming applications. The program's marketing, rather than using the current "SHO" disc logo utilized by Showtime, used the wordmark version used from 1984 to 1997 to promote the series to its time period.

Premiere
On January 14, 2019, the series held its world premiere at the Ace Hotel in Los Angeles, California. Those in attendance included David Caspe, Jordan Cahan, Seth Rogen, Evan Goldberg, Don Cheadle, Regina Hall, Jon Hamm, Horatio Sanz, Paul Scheer, Yassir Lester, Ken Marino, Vanessa Bell Calloway, Elia Cantu, Kadeem Hardison, Kurt Braunohler, Jennifer Zaborowski, Xosha Roquemore, David Krumholtz, David Nevins, and Amy Israel.

Reception

Critical response
The series was met with a mixed response from critics upon its premiere, but Cheadle's performance was widely praised.  the series' first season holds a 56% approval rating with an average rating of 6.08 out of 10 based on 45 reviews on the review aggregation website Rotten Tomatoes. The website's critical consensus reads, "Black Monday zips with irrepressible style and a seductively stacked cast of charismatics starsbut this Wall Street odyssey is too preoccupied with flash to ferment its needed substance." Metacritic, which uses a weighted average, assigned the series a score of 57 out of 100 based on 29 critics' reviews, indicating "mixed or average reviews".

The second season was met with a mixed to positive response from critics. As of August 2020, the series' second season holds a 83% approval rating with an average rating of 5 out of 10 based on 6 reviews on Rotten Tomatoes.

Ratings

Season 1

Season 2

Awards and nominations

Notes

References

External links
 
 

2010s American black comedy television series
2019 American television series debuts
2021 American television series endings
2020s American black comedy television series
English-language television shows
Showtime (TV network) original programming
Television series by Sony Pictures Television
Television series set in 1986
Television series set in 1987
Television shows directed by Justin Tipping
Television shows set in New York City